The 2003 Southampton Council election took place on 1 May 2003 to elect members of Southampton Unitary Council in Hampshire, England. One third of the council was up for election and the council stayed under no overall control.

After the election, the composition of the council was:
Liberal Democrat 18
Labour 16
Conservative 12
Liberal 1
Independent 1

Election result
The results saw the Liberal Democrats become the largest party on the council with 18 seats, but without a majority, after making 3 gains. They gained the seats of Coxford and Millbrook from Liberal party councillors who had previously left the Liberal Democrats, and the seat of Woolston from Labour. This was the first time the Liberal Democrats, or their predecessors the Liberal Party, had been the largest party in Southampton for over 90 years.

Labour were reduced to 16 seats after losing another seat in Sholing to the Conservatives who went up to 12 seats. The Liberal party defeats reduced them to only 1 seat, while 1 independent who was not up for re-election remained. Overall turnout was up by only 0.8% from 2002 at 29%, despite all voters having the option to vote by post.

Following the election, discussions were held in order to decide who would be to take control of the council, with Labour trying to remain in control and the Liberal Democrats to take over. The Conservatives refused to support either of the other groups, meaning that the Liberal and independent councillors held the balance, as Labour's Parvin Damani had a potential casting vote as mayor. However the full council meeting on 21 May saw Liberal Democrat Adrian Vinson become council leader by 1 vote, after gaining the support of independent and formerly Labour councillor Paul Russell, after Vinson had earlier offered Russell a cabinet post.

Ward results

Bargate

Bassett

Bevois

Bitterne

Bitterne Park

Coxford

Freemantle

Harefield

Millbrook

Peartree

Portswood

Redbridge

Shirley

Sholing

Swaythling

Woolston

References

2003 English local elections
2003
2000s in Southampton